Rose Hills is a neighborhood on the Eastside of Los Angeles.

History

Historical reports and maps in archives indicate that Rose Hills was part of an 1839 Mexican land grant named "Rancho Rosa Castilla".  The first recorded owner of the Rancho was Juan Ballesteros, registrar of the pueblo. After statehood, land claim #309 SD was filed in 1852 to confirm it. By the late 1850s the land had been transferred twice, and was owned by Anacleto Lestrade, priest at La Iglesia de Nuestra Señora la Reina de los Ángeles, the mission church of the Pueblo de Los Ángeles. One of the original 36 adobes in California stood on Rancho Rosa Castilla.

Geography

In 2006, The Rose Hills Neighborhood and Community Alliance gathered signatures on a petition stating "the community of Rose Hills is requesting that our representative of the 14th District Council Office initiate a motion to request the City Council of Los Angeles to support the installation of additional community signs for recognition". Letters of support were submitted by state senator Ed Hernandez, Our Lady of Guadalupe Church, the Los Angeles Public Library and others. Historic newspaper articles using the Rose Hills name were also submitted.  

On September 12, 2013, city council issued a motion stating that "the community of Rose Hills has been in existence for hundreds of years".  It noted that Rose Hills was among several communities surrounding El Sereno and instructed the Department of Transportation to install five signs at the following locations: Monterey Road at the Monterey Road Pass, Huntington Drive North and Collis Avenue, Soto Street and Mission Road, before the Soto Street Bridge, Mission Road and Broadway Place, and Mercury Avenue and Reynolds Avenue.

The neighborhood of Hermon is located to the north, with signage installed on the north side of the Monterey Road Pass

Education

 Huntington Drive Elementary School (opened in 1909 as Rose Hill Elementary School)

Parks and recreation

 Rose Hill Recreation Center, 4560 Mercury Avenue
 Rose Hill Park, 3606 N. Boundary Avenue

References

Neighborhoods in Los Angeles
El Sereno, Los Angeles
Northeast Los Angeles